Sieciechów may refer to:
Sieciechów, Masovian Voivodeship (east-central Poland)
Sieciechów, Łódź Voivodeship (central Poland)
 Sieciechów (Sytykhiv), a village in Lviv Oblast of western Ukraine;